The 2007 Conference USA Football Championship Game was played on December 1, 2007 between the UCF Knights, the champion of C-USA's East Division, and the West Division champion, the Tulsa Golden Hurricane, at Bright House Networks Stadium (now known as Spectrum Stadium) in Orlando, Florida. The game kicked off at 12:00 pm EST and was televised by ESPN.

Game summary
Under conference rules, the game was held at the home field of the team with the best record in conference play; since UCF finished C-USA play at 7–1, better than Tulsa's 6–2, the game was held at the Knights' home field.

Tulsa and UCF met at the C-USA Championship for the second time; Tulsa beat UCF at the Florida Citrus Bowl (now known as Camping World Stadium) in Downtown Orlando in 2005 by a score of 44-27.

Kevin Smith continued his dominance, running for 284 yards with 4 touchdowns.  Tulsa kept it close in the first half as UCF's defense seemed slow to get started.  In the second half, however, they only scored on a safety.  Paul Smith, the Tulsa quarterback, threw for 426 yards and three touchdowns, but also gave up three interceptions. UCF won their first ever conference title in football.

Kevin Smith finished the game with 2,448 rushing yards on the season, second all-time for single-season rushing yards in FBS history.  Only Barry Sanders, who rushed for 2,628 yards in 1989 for Oklahoma State, rushed for more yards in a single season.

Teams

Tulsa Golden Hurricane 
Under Head Coach Todd Graham, Tulsa finished the 2007 regular season 9-3 (6-2) with a powerful offense averaging over 41 points per game, but their defense was a struggle all season letting up 33 points per game. Their offense was mostly powered by their talented quarterback Paul Smith who had 5,065 passing yards and 47 touchdowns on the season. Current Auburn Head Coach Gus Malzahn was in his first year as Tulsa's Offensive Coordinator.

UCF Knights 
UCF was led to a 9-3 regular season record with a 7-1 conference record by Head Coach George O'Leary in 2007. UCF also had a prolific offense that averaged 35.9 points per game and were led by their Running Back Kevin Smith who had one of the best seasons a college football running back has ever had, rushing a record 450 times for 2,567 yards and 30 total touchdowns. UCF did most of their damage on the ground, as quarterback Kyle Israel threw for 2,173 yards and 15 touchdowns to his 11 interceptions.

Game Statistic Leaders

Passing Yards 
TLSA

P. Smith28-55, 426 YDS, 3 TD, 3 INT

UCF

K. Israel6-13, 128 YDS

Rushing Yards 
TLSA

T. Adams18 CAR, 41 YDS

UCF

K. Smith39 CAR, 284 YDS, 4 TD

Receiving Yards 
TLSA

C. Clay6 REC, 112 YDS, 1 TD

UCF

R. Ross3 REC, 63 YDS

Team Statistics

Scoring Summary

References 

Championship
Conference USA Football Championship Game
UCF Knights football games
Tulsa Golden Hurricane football games
Sports competitions in Orlando, Florida
December 2007 sports events in the United States
Conference USA Football
2000s in Orlando, Florida